The Zagorje Party ( or ZS) is a regional political party in Croatia.

Zagorje Party was founded in Krapina on 10 January 2004. Zagorje party is a regional party that is active on the territory of Hrvatsko Zagorje and all of the northwestern Croatia. Party's goal is to gather people from Zagorje, as well as from other parts of Croatia, that are willing to participate in cultural, economic and moral transformation of the northwestern Croatia. The basic Party principles are "a man and his rights".

The party advocates for women's rights, so it accordingly determined that there must be at least 30% of women on all of its electoral lists. An important part of party politics is the policy of sustainable development. Therefore, Party is guided by the principle: "Act locally, think globally". The party advocates separation of church and state, but respects and cherishes the Christian tradition of the Croatian nation.

Party's motto is: "We were born as Zagorci! We live as Zagorci! We will die as Zagorci!"

Electoral history

Legislative

References

External links

Political parties established in 2004
2004 establishments in Croatia
Regionalist parties in Croatia